Oskar Nisu (born 11 August 1994) is an Estonian professional road cyclist, who currently rides for the Denver Disruptors. He competed in the road race at the 2021 UCI Road World Championships.

Major results

2011
 1st  Road race, National Junior Road Championships
 1st Overall Tour de la Région de Lódz
1st Stages 1 & 3
 1st Stage 1 (TTT) Saaremaa Velotuur
2012
 National Road Championships
1st  Road race
2nd Time trial
 Tour de la Région de Lódz
1st Points classification
1st Stage 4
 1st Stage 1 (TTT) Saaremaa Velotuur
2014
 1st  Time trial, National Under-23 Road Championships
 National Road Championships
3rd Time trial
5th Road race
 3rd Grand Prix de Beuvry-la-Forêt
2015
 4th Time trial, National Road Championships
2016
 4th Time trial, National Road Championships
2018
 9th Overall Dookoła Mazowsza
2019
 2nd  Criterium, Island Games
 3rd Time trial, National Road Championships
2020
 9th Gooikse Pijl
2021
 1st Grand Prix Michel Wuyts

References

External links

1994 births
Living people
Estonian male cyclists
People from Viimsi Parish